"Closer" is a song by Canadian duo Tegan and Sara from their seventh studio album, Heartthrob (2013). The song was written by Tegan Quin with contributions from Sara Quin and Greg Kurstin. It was released as the lead single from the album in September 2012. Closer won "Single of the Year" at the 2014 Juno Awards. The song has been featured on TV series such as Glee and BoJack Horseman. In 2013, it peaked at number one on Billboards Hot Dance Club Songs chart. It also became their first single to chart on the Billboard Hot 100. On April 20, 2013, 3600 vinyl copies of Closer Remixed, including four more tracks than the digital EP, were exclusively released for Record Store Day 2013. On July 4, 2013, "Closer" was certified platinum in Canada.

Lyrics and composition

Tegan spoke of the song during an interview with Rolling Stone magazine in September 2012, saying, "Although I do imagine that this would be an okay song to make out to, all I intended was to write something sweet that reminded the listener of a time before complicated relationships, drama and heartbreak. I was writing about my youth, a time when we got closer by linking arms and walking down our school hallway, or talked all night on the telephone about every thought or experience we'd ever had. It wasn't necessarily even about hooking up or admitting your feelings back then. In fact, that rarely happened. It was the anticipation of something maybe happening that was truly exciting and satisfying. We were perpetually getting closer, yet we rarely got physical with one another, if ever. These relationships existed in a state of sexual and physical ambiguity." Sara encouraged Tegan to be less self-deprecating when writing the song. Tegan was hesitant about writing a straightforward love song and was concerned that using the phrase "get physical" would remind listeners of Australian singer Olivia Newton-John's 1981 single "Physical".

A synth-pop and dance-pop song, "Closer" is set in common time with a tempo of 137 beats per minute. Its rhythm uses a four-to-the-floor beat with a prominent kick drum. The song is written in C major, with a I-IV-V-I circle progression. The song's sections make use of sharply contrasting dynamics, eventually leading to a synthesizer breakdown. The song was influenced by Tegan's "favorite, mid-'90s dance tracks" by Erasure and Ace of Base.

Critical reception
"Closer" placed thirteenth on The Village Voices 2013 Pazz & Jop singles list. Consequence of Sound called it "genius levels of fun", while Alter the Press! compared the song to "Dancing on My Own" by Robyn. In 2019, Billboard included the song in its list of the "30 Lesbian Love Songs".

Music video
The music video for "Closer" premiered on November 29, 2012, on Tegan and Sara's official YouTube channel. It starts with Tegan and Sara performing karaoke of the song. It then begins to feature different scenes in-between such as various couples doing various party activities as well as putting make-up on one another, playing spin the bottle, and kissing on top of a car. Tegan and Sara are also seen singing on a swing set and jumping on a trampoline.

In popular culture
The song was covered on Glee in the episode "Feud" (2013) by  Ryder Lynn (Blake Jenner) and Jake Puckerman (Jacob Artist) with New Directions. It was featured in the pilot of the Freeform original series Young & Hungry and was later featured again in the season 5 episode "Young & Amnesia". The song was also featured in season 12 of Degrassi. The song plays over the final moments and end credits of first-season finale of the Netflix original series BoJack Horseman which aired on 22 August 2014. It was later used in an AT&T commercial in 2015. It was featured in the 2017 Netflix series Friends from College. WWE also used this song in a promo package to highlight former WWE Diva, AJ Lee. In 2019, it was featured in fifth episode of HBO TV series Mrs. Fletcher.

Track listing

Digital download

Digital remix EP
(Released )

Vinyl remix EP
(Released exclusively for Record Store Day 2013)

Charts

Weekly charts

Year-end charts

Certifications

Awards and nominations

See also
 List of number-one dance singles of 2013 (U.S.)

References

2012 singles
Tegan and Sara songs
Canadian dance-pop songs
Song recordings produced by Greg Kurstin
Songs written by Greg Kurstin
2012 songs
Warner Records singles
Juno Award for Single of the Year singles
Canadian synth-pop songs